CKX has several meanings including:

 Industrial Media, US entertainment company, formerly CKX, Inc. and CORE Media Group
 Chicken Airport IATA code
 CKX-FM in Brandon, Manitoba, Canada
 CKX-TV, former television station in Brandon, Manitoba, Canada
 CKX-AM, callsign of former AM radio station in Brandon which became CKXA-FM